Rocky Fortune is an American radio drama that aired weekly on NBC Radio beginning in October 1953. The series ended its run in March 1954 after 25 episodes. The program was created by George Lefferts. Frank Sinatra voiced the title role of Rocky Fortune for the entire series.

Rocky Fortune aired Tuesday nights on NBC at 9:35 pm Eastern, immediately following Dragnet (and a five-minute John Cameron Swayze newscast). It was a sustaining series, meaning that NBC presented the program without corporate sponsorship. The premiere episode, "Oyster Shucker", originally aired on October 6, 1953.

Characters and story
Frank Sinatra portrayed Rocco Fortunato, also known as Rocky Fortune, a young man of several talents constantly in need of employment and who accepts odd jobs from the fictitious Gridley Employment Agency, often referred to simply as "the Agency." During the course of the series, he would work as a process server, museum tour guide, cabbie, bodyguard, chauffeur, truck driver, social director for a Catskills resort and a carny, in addition to various musical jobs. These assignments typically led Rocky into situations where he would track down criminals, often rescuing people (especially women) in need of help, and ultimately needing to find yet more work. Rocky made many wise remarks, using "hep" slang of the times, and seemed to attract trouble wherever he went.

Sinatra infused the role of Rocky with a witty, tongue-in-cheek quality that acknowledged Sinatra's own career. For example, in the episode "Football Fix", Rocky begins to sing "I've Got the World on a String" while walking down the street, a song Sinatra had performed prior to playing the role of Rocky.

Aside from Sinatra, the only other recurring role on the series was that of Hamilton J. Finger, a solid and dependable (though not very intelligent) police sergeant voiced by Barney Phillips. Other guest roles on Rocky Fortune were voiced by actors such as Raymond Burr, Ed Begley and Jack Kruschen.

Creator of the show George Lefferts was also one of the primary scriptwriters, along with Ernest Kinoy. The two had previously collaborated on other radio programs such as X Minus One and Dimension X:  in the episode "Rocket Racket", Fortune's job is apparently to fly a prototype spaceship. An eccentric oil millionaire tells of his fascination with science fiction and space travel, to which Rocky knowingly acknowledges, "Dimension X." Lefferts and Kinoy would go on to become award-winning writers and producers in the years that followed.

Edward "Eddie" King was the show's narrator, who began each episode by stating, "NBC presents Frank Sinatra, starring as that footloose and fancy-free young gentleman, Rocky Fortune!" (though it was "footloose and frequently unemployed..." for the first two episodes).

The final episode, "Boarding House Doublecross", aired on March 30, 1954, less than a week after Sinatra won the Academy Award for Best Supporting Actor for his role as Private Angelo Maggio in the 1953 film, From Here to Eternity. As a running gag towards the end of the show's run, Sinatra would work the phrase "from here to eternity" into the script as a reference to his film role in almost every episode.

Episodes

References

Listen to
OTR Net Library, all 25 episodes of Rocky Fortune
Internet Archive: Rocky Fortune
"Rocky Fortune on Way Back When"

External links

Script for Rocky Fortune episode 19, "Too Many Husbands"

1950s American radio programs
American radio dramas
Detective radio shows
Fortune, Rocky
Fortune, Rocky
1953 radio programme debuts
1954 radio programme endings
1954 radio dramas
NBC radio programs